Tylopilus glutinosus is a species of the fungal family Boletaceae. It is the first generic report for Bangladesh. This species is putatively associated with Shorea robusta.

External links

References

Boletaceae
glutinosus
Fungi described in 2021
Fungi of Bangladesh